Mikhail Lavrov (11 September 1927 – 9 February 1997) was a Soviet racewalker. He competed in the men's 50 kilometres walk at the 1956 Summer Olympics.

References

1927 births
1997 deaths
Athletes (track and field) at the 1956 Summer Olympics
Soviet male racewalkers
Olympic athletes of the Soviet Union
Place of birth missing